Tadeusz Baird (26 July 19282 September 1981) was a Polish composer.

Biography
Baird was born in Grodzisk Mazowiecki, in Poland. His father Edward was Scottish, while his mother Maria (née Popov) was Russian. In 1944 at the age of 16 he was deported to Germany as a forced labourer, and after a failed escape attempt was imprisoned in a concentration camp. After liberation by the Americans he spent six months recovering at the military hospital in Zweckel before returning to Poland. Between 1947 and 1951 Baird studied composition and musicology in Warsaw under Piotr Rytek and Kazimierz Sikorski, and piano with Tadeusz Wituski. In 1949 he founded Group 49 along with Kazimierz Serocki and Jan Krenz. The aim of Group 49 was to write communicative and expressive music according to socialist realism, the dominant ideology in the Eastern Bloc at the time.

After Stalin's death in 1953 he increasingly turned to serialism. In 1956, along with Kazimierz Serocki, he founded the Warsaw Autumn international contemporary music festival. In 1974 he began to teach composition at the National College of Music (currently the Music Academy) in Warsaw. In 1977, now a full professor, he was offered a post to teach a composition class at the Warsaw Academy of Music, and also a membership of the Academie der Künste der Deutschen Demokratischen Republik – Berlin in 1979.

Baird died in 1981, aged 53.

Compositions
He wrote both large scale symphonies and chamber music, however, of great importance in his output are numerous vocal cycles inspired by poetry. He was also a composer of film and theatre music. Baird's music is usually melodic, lyrical, very expressive, and intensely subjective. It is often rooted in the post-Romantic tradition, despite the use of serial techniques. Alistair Wightman identifies Baird as "a late Romantic lyricist and successor not only to Berg, but Mahler and Szymanowski". Like Berg, his use of serialism was always very free and expressive, as in his String Quartet (1957).

But the later works, starting with the 1966 one-act opera Jutro ("tomorrow", based on the short story by Joseph Conrad) become darker, particularly in the orchestral piece Psychodrama (1972) and in his final work, the song cycle for baritone and orchestra Głosy z oddali (‘Voices from afar’), which sets a bleak text by Jarosław Iwaszkiewicz on the subject of death and personal extinction.  This change in perspective was a result of the traumatic experiences he faced during World War II and on into the early 1950s. Barbara Literska sees him as "a prophet of the future of music (postmodernity)".

Music for solo instruments
Sonatina I (1949) for solo piano 
Sonatina II (1952) for solo piano 
Little Suite for Children (1952) for solo piano

Chamber music
Two Caprices for Clarinet and Piano (1953) (2nd Prize, Polish Composers' Union)
Cztery Preludia [Four Preludes] for Bassoon and Piano (1954)
Divertimento for Flute, Clarinet, Oboe, and Bassoon (1956)
String Quartet (1957)
Play for String Quartet (1971)
Variations in Rondo Form for String Quartet (1978)

Orchestral works
Sinfonietta (1949)
Symphony I (1950) - Polish National Prize, 1951
Colas Breugnon: a suite in the old style for string orchestra with flute (1951)
Symphony II, quasi una fantasia (1952)
Concerto for Orchestra (1953)
Cassazione per orchestra (1956)
Four Essays (1958) - UNESCO Prize, 1959
Variations Without a Theme (1962)
Epiphany Music (1963)
Four Novelettes for chamber orchestra (1967)
Sinfonia Breve (1968)
Symphony III (1969) - National Prize, 1970
Psychodrama (1972)
Elegia (1973)
Canzona (1980)

Concertos
Piano Concerto (1949)
Four Dialogs for oboe and chamber orchestra (1964) - UNESCO Prize 1966
Oboe Concerto (1973)
Scenes for cello, harp and orchestra (1977)
Concerto Lugubre (1975) for viola and orchestra

Vocal-instrumental works
Four Love Sonnets for baritone and orchestra (1956) to texts by Shakespeare
Exhortation for reciting voice and orchestra (1960) to old Hebrew texts
Erotyki for soprano and orchestra (1961) to texts by Małgorzata Hilar
Five Songs for mezzo-soprano and six instruments (1970) to texts by H. Poświatowska - National Prize, 1970
Goethe Letters: Cantata for Baritone for mixed choir and orchestra (1970) to texts by Goethe and Charlotta von Stein  
Głosy z oddali [Voices from Afar] for baritone and symphony orchestra (1981) to texts by J. Iwaszkiewicz (1981)

Opera
Tomorrow, a musical drama to a libretto by J. S. Sito (1964-66)

Film Music
 Warsaw In Canaletto Paintings (Warszawa W Obrazach Canaletta) (1955)
 The Noose (Pętla) (1958)
 The Stone Sky (Kamienne Niebo) (1959)
 Year One (Rok Pierwszy) (1960)
 April (Kwiecień) (1961)
 The Artillery Sergeant Kalen (Ogniomistrz Kalen) (1961)
 Night Train (Ludzie Z Pociągu) (1961)
 Samson (1961)
 Between The Shores (Między brzegami) (1962)
 Those Who Are Late (Spoznieni Przechodnie) (1962)
 Manhunter (Naganiacz) (1963)
 The Passenger (Pasażerka) (1963)
 Room For One (Miejsce Dla Jednego) (1963)
 Their Every Day Life (Ich Dzien Powszedni) (1963)
 The Unknown (Nieznany) (1964)
 Visit At The Kings (Wizyta U Królów) (1965)
 Rugged Creativeness (Szorstka Twórczość) (!967)
 When Love Was A Crime (Kiedy Miłość Była Zbrodnią) (1967)

Recordings
 Eastern Discoveries. MSR MS1517 (2015). Four preludes for bassoon and piano
 Epiphany Music. Olympia OCD 312 (1989). Epiphany Music for orchestra, Elegia For orchestra, Four Love Sonnets, Symphony No 3
 Film Music, Volumes 1 and 2. Olympia OCD 604 (1994) and OCD 607 (1995)
 Günter Wand: The Radio Recordings. Profil PH13038 (2016). Four Dialogues for oboe and orchestra
 Orchestral Works. Koch 3-6770-2 (2001). Psychodrama, Oboe Concerto, Scenes for cello, harp and orchestra, Conzona for orchestra, Concerto Lugubre for viola and orchestra
 Polish Piano Concertos. Dux 0651 (2009). Piano Concerto
 Polish Songs. Acte Prealable APO 274 (2013). Trouveurs’ Songs
 Psychodrama. Olympia 326 (2000). Psychodrama, Tomorrow
 Songs and Orchestral Music. Olympia OCD 388 (1993). Voices From Afar, Goethe-Briefe, Scene For cello and harp With orchestra, Canzona for orchestra
 Streichquartette. Colosseum 0648 (1986). Play for string quartet, Variations on Rondo Form, String Quartet No 1
 Szymanowski, Gorecki, Baird. EMI 5 65418 (1995). Colas Breugnon Suite

See also
Polish School (music)

References

External links
Baird page at the Polish Music Center
Tadeusz Baird at PWM Edition
Tadeusz Baird Page at the Polish Music Information Center

1928 births
1981 deaths
People from Grodzisk Mazowiecki
20th-century classical composers
Academic staff of the Chopin University of Music
International Rostrum of Composers prize-winners
Polish classical composers
Polish male classical composers
Polish opera composers
People from Warsaw Voivodeship (1919–1939)
Polish people of Russian descent
Polish people of Scottish descent
Twelve-tone and serial composers
20th-century male musicians
Recipients of the State Award Badge (Poland)